Gorge Trio is an American experimental rock band based in Oakland, California. It is composed of three-fourths of the critically acclaimed math rock band Colossamite, which disbanded in 1998, and is survived by three releases on Skin Graft Records.

Gorge Trio includes current members of Deerhoof, The Flying Luttenbachers, Natural Dreamers, and former members of underground pioneers Iceburn and Sicbay.

Band members
John Dieterich
Chad Popple
Ed Rodriguez

Discography

Albums
 Dead Chicken Fear No Knife (Freeland Records - Italy, 1998)
 For Loss Of - w/ Milo Fine (Freeland Records - Italy, 1999)
 The Made Ups (Self Released, 2002)
 Open Mouth, o' Wisp (Skin Graft Records, 2004)

External links
 Gorge Trio - MySpace
 Skin Graft Records band page
 Puzzling Archive, MP3 tracks from the first two out of print albums
[ Allmusic entry for Gorge Trio]

Rock music groups from California
American experimental rock groups
Musical groups from Oakland, California